Quch Kandi (also Romanized as Qūch Kandī; also known as Kūch Kandī) is a village in Gejlarat-e Gharbi Rural District, Aras District, Poldasht County, West Azerbaijan Province, Iran. At the 2006 census, its population was 1,086, in 219 families.

References 

Populated places in Poldasht County